Gregg Ernst (born September 30, 1961), is a former Strongman competitor and Powerlifter from Nova Scotia Canada.

Strongman career
Ernst is best known for competing in the 1991 and 1992 World's Strongest Man competitions, finishing 6th and 7th respectively. Gregg began lifting at age 12 when his father bought him a set of weights for Christmas. By age 21, Ernst was a powerlifting world champion, winning the Atlantic Powerlifting Championships in 1982 and 1983. Gregg also won Canada's Strongest Man in 1990 & 1991, and the Nova Scotia Farmer's Walk in 1988 and 1989. Gregg once backlifted 2422 kg (app. 5,340 lbs.) of two cars on a platform to set a world record for live weight backlifting in July 1993. This record still stands today. At the 1992 World's Strongest Man contest in Iceland, Ernst set a world record in the Husafell Stone carry, carrying the 410 lb. stone 70 meters. The record stood for 25 years. 

Ernst is also a blacksmith and a beef farmer, plays several instruments, and sang professionally with his four oldest sons.

Personal Records
Squat – 
Deadlift – 
Bench Press –

References
http://www.la84foundation.org/SportsLibrary/IGH/IGH0301/IGH0301a.pdf

Canadian strength athletes
Canadian powerlifters
1961 births
Living people
Sportspeople from Nova Scotia
People from Lunenburg County, Nova Scotia